Applegarth is an unincorporated community located within Monroe Township in Middlesex County, New Jersey, United States. The settlement is located in the southern portion of the township and is traversed by the road of the same name, Applegarth Road (CR 619). At the location of the original settlement, at the intersection of Applegarth, Wycoffs Mills, and Old Church Roads, there is a restaurant, farmland, and the Applegarth Fire Department. Further north along Applegarth Road are housing developments, age-restricted communities, and two elementary schools: Applegarth and Oak Tree.

References

Monroe Township, Middlesex County, New Jersey
Unincorporated communities in Middlesex County, New Jersey
Unincorporated communities in New Jersey